Ebola-chan is an internet meme popularized by 4chan depicting a moe anthropomorphization (gijinka) of the Ebola virus. The first known image of Ebola-chan began on the Japanese social media site, Pixiv, in 2014. A few days after, it was posted 4chan's /pol/ (politically incorrect) thread, who began posting messages praising Ebola-chan. Soon after, 4chan users began spreading the meme to Nairaland, the largest online message board in Nigeria, accompanying images of Ebola-chan with racially charged messages and associated conspiracy theories. This included claims that Ebola was CIA-made and that white people were performing rituals for Ebola to spread. The meme's spread has been considered racially motivated and has been attributed to increased mistrust between West Africans and medical professionals.

Background 

In 2014, ebola virus epidemic broke out in West Africa. The first cases of the outbreak were recorded in Guinea in December 2013. Subsequently, the outbreak spread to the neighbouring countries of Liberia and Sierra Leone, with addition outbreaks in Nigeria and Mali. The epidemic would go on to receive widespread, world-wide media coverage, with increased public awareness and concern over the virus and its transmission.

History 
The first known image of the "Ebola-chan" meme was originally published on Pixiv on August 4, 2014. On August 7, 2014, Ebola-chan was posted to the /pol/ thread on 4chan. The image was accompanied with a tongue-in-cheek message that would threaten users with death and pain if they did not reply with the phrase "I Love You Ebola-chan.” The image began appearing on Reddit, Facebook, and DeviantArt, with users often making comments such as “GOOD LUCK EBOLA-CHAN!” and “HAIL BLOOD-GODDESS! HAIL EBOLA-CHAN!”, accompanied with racially charged messages.

Users on 4chan began uploading the meme to Nairaland, in an effort to "increase tensions between blacks and whites in Africa" by convincing people in West Africa that Ebola was created by the white race, taking advantage of African beliefs in voodoo. These images would include makeshift shrines and allusions to death cults, blood sacrifices, and demon worship. While the initial post was mostly seen as an attempt at 'trolling', many Nigerian users of the site were later convinced that American and European users were performing “magical rituals in order to spread the disease and kill people" and regarded Ebola-chan as a plague goddess. Other threads would promote the conspiracy theory that Ebola was CIA-made and being intentionally spread by the United States. This would expand into users claiming that Ebola doctors were part of the cult and intentionally spreading the illness. In September 2014, 4chan administrators began removing posts of Ebola-chan from the site.

On October 9, 2014, a man walking his dog in East Longmeadow, Massachusetts found an altar containing an image of Ebola-chan. Accompanying this was a carved wooden mask, an unlit candle, Christmas decorations, sheets of paper with incomprehensible writing and symbols, and a bowl of rice mixed with twigs and fake blood. The police investigating the shrine believe it was connected to a recent total lunar eclipse, or a blood moon.

Description 
Ebola-chan is an anime anthropomorphization of the Ebola virus. The character has a long pink hair that curls in the characteristic shape of Ebola. Ebola-chan has been described as being caucasian-stylized. Ebola-chan was often depicted wearing a nurse outfit and holding a bloodied-skull. Some depictions of the character include small purple demon wings and a happy disposition. Oftentime, the character would be depicted in a sexualized manner, alongside a lesbian partner.

Reception 
Ebola-chan has been criticized as racially motivated and a concerted effort to increase black-white tensions. During the height of the outbreak, aid workers reported they faced mistrust and misinformation in affected communities, with many West Africans believing that the disease was the work of 'sorcerers'. The International Business Times and Washington Post would describe Ebola-chan as an exacerbating factor.

Ebola-chan has been compared to the gijinka ISIS-chan, as they were both used to personify controversial topics. In 2020, during the COVID-19 pandemic, 4chan would create Corona-chan, a personification of coronavirus which would also be compared to Ebola-chan.

Popular culture 
The game Yandere Simulator contains an "Ebola Mode" easter egg where Ebola-chan is used as a playable character.

See also 

 Corona-chan, a later moe anthropomorphization of a disease

References 

Fictional characters introduced in 2014
Moe anthropomorphism
Ebola in popular culture
Internet memes introduced in 2014
4chan